The 1992 United States Senate election in New York took place on November 3, 1992, alongside other elections to the United States Senate in other states, as well as elections to the United States House of Representatives and various state and local elections. Incumbent Republican U.S. Senator Al D'Amato narrowly won re-election to a third term. , this was the last time the Republicans won a U.S. Senate election in New York.

Republican primary

Candidates

Declared
 Al D'Amato, incumbent Senator

Withdrew
 Laurance Rockefeller Jr., environmental attorney and nephew of former New York Governor and Vice President Nelson Rockefeller (failed to submit signatures)

Results
Senator D'Amato was unopposed for re-nomination.

Democratic primary

Candidates

Declared
Robert Abrams, New York Attorney General
Geraldine Ferraro, former U.S. Representative, and Democratic nominee for Vice President in 1984
Elizabeth Holtzman, New York City Comptroller
Al Sharpton, Baptist minister and civil rights activist

Withdrew
Robert Mrazek, U.S. Representative

Declined 

 Mark J. Green, New York City Commissioner of Consumer Affairs; Democratic nominee for Senate in 1986

Campaign
The Democratic primary campaign featured State Attorney General Robert Abrams, former U.S. Congresswoman and 1984 vice presidential candidate Geraldine Ferraro, Reverend Al Sharpton, and New York City Comptroller and former Congresswoman Elizabeth Holtzman. Congressman Robert J. Mrazek was also an early candidate, but withdrew from the race after being named in the House banking scandal. Abrams was considered the initial front-runner.

Ferraro emphasized her career as a teacher, prosecutor, congresswoman, and mother, and positioned herself as being tough on crime. She soon took the lead in the polls, additionally capitalizing on her name recognition from 1984. However, she drew attacks from the media and her opponents over her husband John Zaccaro's finances and business relationships. Initially, Ferraro used the attacks in an attempt to galvanize the feminist vote, but her lead began to dwindle under the criticism, and she released additional tax returns in an attempt to defray the attacks. Holtzman ran a negative ad accusing Ferraro and Zaccaro of taking more than $300,000 in rent in the 1980s from a pornographer with purported ties to organized crime.

Results

In the primary, Abrams won by less than one percentage point, winning 37 percent of the vote to Ferraro's 36 percent.  Ferraro did not concede the election for two weeks.

General election

Campaign
After Abrams emerged as the nominee, the Democrats remained divided. In particular, Abrams spent much of the remainder of the campaign trying to get Ferraro's endorsement. Ferraro, enraged and bitter after the nature of the primary, ignored Abrams, and accepted Bill Clinton's request to campaign for his presidential bid instead. She was eventually persuaded by state party leaders into giving an unenthusiastic endorsement, with just three days to go before the general election, in exchange for an apology by Abrams for the tone of the primary.

Abrams was also accused of engaging in ethnically charged attacks against the Italian ancestry of both Ferraro and D'Amato. Ahead of the primary, Ferraro sought to defend herself against accusations that she received financial support from organized crime in her 1978 congressional campaign, claiming that, "If I were not Italian American, this whole thing would never have been brought up." In October, Abrams was again accused of anti-Italian political attacks, after calling D'Amato a "fascist" at a campaign event and alleging that he had engaged in the "big lie techniques" of Nazi propaganda officers. At a Columbus Day parade the following day, D'Amato accused Abrams of engaging in ethnic insults on his Italian ancestry, and in a subsequent campaign ad featured images of Italian fascist leader Benito Mussolini to depict the word "fascist" as an anti-Italian slur.  Abrams narrowly lost the general election, partially as a result of these controversies.

Polling

Results

See also
 1992 United States Senate elections

References

1992 New York (state) elections
New York
1992